Charles Rodney Morgan (2 December 1828 – 14 January 1854) was a British politician. He was the Conservative Member of Parliament for Brecon from 1852 until his death in 1854, in Marseille. He was the eldest son of Charles Morgan, 1st Baron Tredegar.

1828 births
1854 deaths
Conservative Party (UK) MPs for Welsh constituencies
UK MPs 1852–1857
Heirs apparent who never acceded